High Hat is a 1989 album compiling tracks from Boy George's second and third UK and European solo albums, Tense Nervous Headache and Boyfriend.

Production and release
Since neither Tense Nervous Headache or Boyfriend are any longer available, High Hat remains the only place to find any of Boy George's songs from 1988 to 1989. While High Hat has only ten tracks, the two other albums together included eighteen tracks: nine on the vinyl and twelve on the CD and cassette for Tense Nervous Headache; plus eight for Boyfriend, one of which (the hi-energy remix of "No Clause 28", also known as "Pascal Gabriel Mix") would later re-surface on Jesus Loves You's The Martyr Mantras album.

Tense Nervous Headache was shelved in the UK shortly after release of the first single due to lack of interest (or, as George put it in his autobiography, after it "died a solitary death"), despite the singer getting to No. 1 in the UK Singles Chart the previous year with "Everything I Own". Half of the ten tracks on High Hat were quite unsuccessful singles either taken from Tense Nervous Headache or Boyfriend: "Don't Cry", "Whisper", "Don't Take My Mind on a Trip", "You Found Another Guy" and "Whether They Like It or Not".

The only track actually taken from High Hat as an independent single in the United States was the US remix of the opener "Don't Take My Mind on a Trip"; the version of which included on High Hat is slightly different from that originally opening Boyfriend. "Don't Take My Mind on a Trip" was a club hit in Canada and the US, charting at No. 5 on the Billboard R&B charts. "You Found Another Guy" went into the top 40 of the same charts also. High Hat nonetheless did a little better than its US predecessor Sold, reaching number 126 on the Billboard charts. It was also released in Australia (V2555) and Mexico (LEMP-1640).

Critical reception

William Ruhlmann from AllMusic gave the album three out of five stars and wrote that while Boy George was in the band Culture Club, together they "scored surprising across-the-board success with a wild new fashion sense and old-fashioned pop-soul music", but "as a solo artist [he] seems determined to address a much smaller, more targeted audience". According to Ruhlmann, in the majority songs on the album, George "wants to engage in thinly veiled confessions set to new jack swing percussion tracks into which he nearly disappears".

Track listing
 "Don't Take My Mind on a Trip" (US Remix) – 5:21 (Griffin)
 "Whisper" – 5:40 (O'Dowd, Maidman, Bobby Z)
 "Whether They Like It or Not" – 5:10 (Griffin, O'Dowd, Bell)
 "You Found Another Guy" – 4:27 (Griffin, Bell, Middleton)
 "You Are My Heroin" – 6:21 (O'Dowd, Maidman, Nightingale, Stevens, Fletcher)
 "I'm Not Sleeping Anymore" – 4:20 (Griffin, O'Dowd)
 "Kipsy" – 6:06 (O'Dowd, Nightingale, Dewar, Geary)
 "Don't Cry" (single version) – 4:09 (O'Dowd, Maidman, Bobby Z)
 "Girl with Combination Skin" – 6:00 (O'Dowd, Fletcher, Maidman, Nightingale)
 "Something Strange Called Love" (edit) – 3:59 (O'Dowd, Vincent, Dewar)

Personnel

Tracks 2, 5, 7–10

 Boy George –  lead vocals, co-production (tracks: 7, 10)
 Glenn Nightingale –  guitars and other voices
 Ian Maidman –  bass, keyboards
 Bobby Z. –  drums, production on (tracks: 2, 5, 8, 9)
 Amanda Vincent – keyboards
Vic Martin –  keyboards
 Richie Stevens –  drums ("Kipsy")
 Derek Green –  other voices
Carroll Thompson –  other voices
Helen Terry –  other voices
Beverley Skeete –  other voices
Belva Haney –  other voices
Wendell Morrison Jr. –  other voices
Juliet Roberts, Nevada Cato –  other voices
 David Ulm, Carol Steel –  percussion
 Jagdeep Singh – tabla and other voices
 Simon Tyrrel –  drum programming
Andy Dewar – drum programming
 Anne Dudley –  all string arrangements
 Kenny Wellington – brass section
David "Baps" Baptiste – brass section
Nat Augustin – brass section
Sid Gauld  – brass section
 Ed Jones – major saxophone
 Desmond Foster –  other bass
 MC Kinky (Caron Geary) – toasting ("Kipsy")
 Paul Lee – choir ("Mama Never Knew")
Iris Sutherland – choir ("Mama Never Knew")
Yvonne White – choir ("Mama Never Knew")
 Jock Loveband – engineer
 Alan Douglas – engineer
Martin White – engineer
 Terry Reed – engineer
Paul Wright – engineer
Renny Hill – engineer
Phil Legg – engineer
Robin Evans – engineer
 Mike Pela – mixing (tracks: 2, 5, 8, 9), co-production on (tracks:  7, 10)

Tracks 1, 3, 4, 6
 Boy George –  lead vocals
 Lee Drakeford –  backing vocals
 Zan – backing vocals
Marsha McClurkin – backing vocals
Mauricette Martin – backing vocals
 Teddy Riley – all instruments, backing vocals, arrangements
 Bernard Belle – acoustic guitar & backing vocals
 Dennis Mitchell – engineer
 Bill Esses – assistant engineer
 Gene Griffin – production

Charts

References

Boy George albums
1989 compilation albums
Virgin Records compilation albums